Steven Craig Gunderson (born May 10, 1951) is an American former politician who was a Republican U.S. Representative for representing Wisconsin's 3rd congressional district from 1981 to 1997, when he was succeeded by Democrat Ron Kind. After leaving office, he was president and CEO of the Council on Foundations, and then of Career Education Colleges and Universities.

Early years
Gunderson grew up near Whitehall, Wisconsin. After studying at the University of Wisconsin–Madison, he went on to train at the Brown School of Broadcasting in Minneapolis.

Political career

Gunderson served in the Wisconsin State Assembly from 1975 to 1979 before being elected to the U.S. House of Representatives in 1980, to represent Wisconsin's 3rd congressional district. First elected to the 97th Congress, he served eight terms in the House and did not seek re-election to the 105th Congress in 1996. He was appointed by President Barack Obama to the President's Commission on White House Fellows in January 2010.

Gunderson advocated for expedited immigration rights to the Hmong people, who had been allied with U.S. war efforts during the Vietnam War and later faced persecution under the Communist government of Laos. In an October 1995 National Review article, Michael Johns, a former Republican White House aide and Heritage Foundation policy analyst, praised Gunderson's efforts in behalf of the Hmong people, quoting Gunderson as telling a Hmong gathering in Wisconsin: "I do not enjoy standing up and saying to my government that you are not telling the truth, but if that is necessary to defend truth and justice, I will do that." Republicans also called several congressional hearings on alleged persecution of the Hmong in Laos in an apparent attempt to generate further support for their opposition to the Hmong's repatriation to Laos. Led by Gunderson and other Hmong advocates in Congress, the Clinton administration's policy of forced repatriation of the Hmong was ultimately overturned and thousands were granted U.S. immigration rights.

Personal life
On March 24th, 1994, Gunderson was outed as gay on the House floor by representative Bob Dornan (R-CA) during a debate over federal funding for gay-friendly curriculum, making him one of the first openly gay members of Congress and the first openly gay Republican representative. In 1996, Gunderson was the only Republican in Congress to vote against the Defense of Marriage Act, and he has been a vocal supporter of gay rights causes since leaving Congress. During his time in the House, Gunderson was one of only two openly gay Republicans serving in Congress, the other being Jim Kolbe of Arizona.

Published works
 House and Home, E. P. Dutton, 1996,  (with Rob Morris and Bruce Bawer)

See also
 List of LGBT members of the United States Congress

References

External links

 
 HRC:Steven Gunderson 

|-

|-

1951 births
20th-century American politicians
20th-century American memoirists
American Lutherans
Gay politicians
LGBT appointed officials in the United States
LGBT Christians
LGBT members of the United States Congress
Gay memoirists
LGBT state legislators in Wisconsin
LGBT people from Wisconsin
LGBT conservatism in the United States
Living people
Lutherans from Wisconsin
Republican Party members of the Wisconsin State Assembly
People from Osseo, Wisconsin
People from Whitehall, Wisconsin
Politicians from Eau Claire, Wisconsin
Republican Party members of the United States House of Representatives from Wisconsin
University of Wisconsin–Madison alumni
Writers from Wisconsin
American gay writers